Jacques Jean Claude Santini (born 25 April 1952) is a French former professional footballer and manager. He played for Saint-Étienne during the 1970s, and reached the European Cup final with them in 1976. He has coached the France national team - winning the 2003 FIFA Confederations Cup and reaching the quarter-finals of Euro 2004 - and clubs including Olympique Lyonnais.

Managerial career

Santini is one of the most accomplished football managers in France.  Together with Jean Michel Aulas and Bernard Lacombe he was involved in the transformation of Lyon into a French football giant.  From 1997 to 2000 he was Sports' director, helping lay the foundation which resulted in Lyon becoming the best football club in France.  As manager of Lyon from 2000-2002 he was winner of French League Cup in 2001, and in 2002 he won the French Championship.

Santini was chosen as "The best French coach" in 2002 by France Football and World's The Best National Coach of the Year in 2003 by International Federation of Football History & Statistics (IFFHS)
Santini replaced Roger Lemerre as France manager in 2002.
He had already resigned from the position before Euro 2004, where France surprisingly lost to Greece in the quarter-final.

Santini took the managerial position at Premier League club Tottenham Hotspur after Euro 2004.
He surprisingly announced his resignation after just 13 games. Officially, Santini left England due to personal problems, but it was widely reported that a series of disagreements with then Sporting Director Frank Arnesen led to his departure.
Speaking in 2005, Santini said he quit partly because he felt agreements with the club were broken, but he admitted he "dug his own grave" by agreeing to join the club before the end of Euro 2004.

He took the job of head coach of AJ Auxerre in Ligue 1 in 2005, but was sacked in 2006 due to his conflict with Vice-President of Auxerre Guy Roux.

On 23 June 2008, Santini was linked with the vacant managerial position at Scottish Premier League club Hearts but he refused the offer.

Managerial statistics
Source:

Honours

Player
Saint-Étienne
Division 1: 1969–70, 1973–74, 1974–75, 1975–76, 1980–81
Coupe de France: 1969–70, 1973–74, 1974–75, 1976–77

Manager
Lyon
Division 1: 2001–02
Coupe de la Ligue: 2000–01

France
FIFA Confederations Cup: 2003

References

External links

Jacques Santini  at Soccernet
Profile on French federation site

1952 births
Living people
French people of Italian descent
Sportspeople from the Territoire de Belfort
French footballers
French football managers
France national football team managers
AS Saint-Étienne players
Montpellier HSC players
Toulouse FC managers
Lille OSC managers
AS Saint-Étienne managers
FC Sochaux-Montbéliard managers
Olympique Lyonnais managers
Ligue 1 managers
Premier League managers
Expatriate football managers in England
Tottenham Hotspur F.C. managers
AJ Auxerre managers
2003 FIFA Confederations Cup managers
UEFA Euro 2004 managers
FIFA Confederations Cup-winning managers
French expatriate football managers
French expatriate sportspeople in England
Association football midfielders
Footballers from Bourgogne-Franche-Comté